Patrick Bosso (born 12 October 1962) is a French comedian and actor. He appeared in more than twenty films since 1996.

Filmography

References

External links 

1962 births
Living people
French male film actors
French people of Italian descent